The University of the Sacred Heart Gulu (USHG) is a private university affiliated with the Roman Catholic Archdiocese of Gulu in Uganda. It caters to students primarily from Uganda and neighboring South Sudan and the Democratic Republic of the Congo.

Location
The geographical coordinates of the university  campus are: 2°46'15.0"N, 32°16'00.0"E (Latitude:2.770833; Longitude:32.266667).

Overview
The university was established to bridge the gap between the services offered by Gulu University, the public institution of higher learning, and the need for higher education among the population, both locally and regionally. Courses in Information and communications technology and Counseling psychology were selected to start with, due to the high levels of suicide, alcohol and drug abuse, as a result of twenty years of the Lord's Resistance Army insurgency.

Courses in the health science arena are planned for the future, in conjunction with St. Mary's Hospital Lacor, St. Joseph's Hospital Kitgum and Dr. Ambrosoli Memorial Hospital, in Agago District. Immediate challenges include the lack of adequate student accommodation near the current lecture rooms.

Academics
The university has one faculty at the beginning; the Faculty of Arts and Social Sciences. The faculty has two departments (a) Department of Counselling and (b) Department of Information and Communications Technology. Two degrees are on offer, the Bachelor of Counselling Psychology and the Bachelor of Information Systems.

See also
Uganda Martyrs University
Lacor Hospital
List of universities in Uganda
Education in Uganda

References

External links
 Website of the University of Sacred Heart Gulu
 Call for Applications for the 2017/2018 Academic Year Intake

Universities and colleges in Uganda
2016 establishments in Uganda
Catholic universities and colleges in Africa
Educational institutions established in 2016
Association of African Universities
Gulu
Gulu District
Acholi sub-region